Wish is the second studio album by Japanese-pop singer Yuna Ito. The album was released on 20 February 2008 on Studioseven Recordings, Sony Music Japan. Wish was released in two versions, CD-only and CD-DVD version. In its first week 49,000 copies were sold. Wish has been certified gold by RIAJ for shipment of 100,000 copies in Japan.

Track listing
 Power of Love
 Alone Again
  (Anata ga Iru Kagiri: A World to Believe In)
 "Urban Mermaid"
 "Heartbeat"
 "Colorful"
 "Unite As One"　
 "Mahaloha"
 "A Long Walk"
 "Moon Rabbit"
 "I'm Here"
 "Wish"
 "Tokyo Days"
 "My Heart Will Go On" (Bonus)

DVD
I'm Here PV
Mahaloha PV
Urban Mermaid PV
 (Anata ga Iru Kagiri: A World to Believe In PV)

Tie-ins
"Urban Mermaid" was used in Japan's Lux shampoo commercial.
 (Anata ga Iru Kagiri: A World to Believe In) was used in au LISMO commercial.
"Tokyo Days" was used in Japan's Proactiv Solution commercial, which featured Yuna Ito.
"Colorful" was used as the theme song for Fuji Television's Mezamashi Doyoubi.
"Unite As One" was used as the ending theme song for Konami's Nintendo DS game  (Time Hollow: Ubawareta Kako wo Motomete).

Chart performance

Oricon sales chart (Japan)

Billboard (Japan)

Singles

References

Oricon Weekly Rankings

2008 albums
Yuna Ito albums